The Buffalo Bills are a professional American football team based in the Buffalo, New York metropolitan area. They are members of the Eastern Division of the American Football Conference (AFC) in the National Football League (NFL). The Bills franchise was formed in 1960 as a charter member of the American Football League (AFL), before joining the NFL as part of the AFL-NFL merger of 1970.

There have been 19 head coaches for the Bills franchise. Buster Ramsey became the first head coach of the Buffalo Bills in 1960, serving for two seasons before being fired by Bills owner Ralph Wilson after the 1961 season. In terms of tenure, Marv Levy has coached more games (182) and seasons (12) than any other coach in franchise history. He coached the Bills to four straight AFC Championships from 1990–1993, but failed to lead the team to a victory in the Super Bowl. One of Levy's predecessors, Lou Saban, who coached the team on two occasions, led the team to the victories in the AFL championship in 1964 and 1965. Three Bills coaches—Saban, Levy and Chuck Knox—have been named coach of the year by at least one major news organization. Levy and Jim Ringo are the only Bills coaches to have been inducted into the Pro Football Hall of Fame.

There have been six "interim" head coaches in Bills history. First, in 1968, head coach Joe Collier was fired two games into the season and replaced by Bills personnel director Harvey Johnson. Johnson did not serve as head coach the following season. Then, five games into the 1976 season, Saban unexpectedly resigned as head coach. He was replaced by Ringo, the team's offensive line coach. Ringo returned to coach the team again in the 1977 season. In October 1985, Kay Stephenson was fired and replaced by assistant head coach Hank Bullough. Just over a year later, Bullough was himself fired and replaced by Marv Levy, who had previously served as coach of the Kansas City Chiefs. Levy would then serve as Bills head coach for the next 12 seasons.  In 2016, Anthony Lynn replaced Rex Ryan for the final game of the season.

Following Levy's retirement, the Bills experienced limited success under a series of successive head coaches.  Wade Phillips, the Bills defensive coordinator for the last three years under Levy, took over head coaching duties for the 1998 season.  Phillips served as head coach for three seasons, making the playoffs in his first two (He was the last coach to lead the Bills to the playoffs until  Sean McDermott became coach in 2017).  After Phillips' departure following the 2000 season, Gregg Williams was named head coach.  Williams served as coach for three seasons.  At the end of the 2003 season, Williams' contract was not renewed.  Mike Mularkey was named as the new head coach for the 2004 season, leading the Bills to their first winning season since 1999.  The Bills experienced less success under Mularkey during 2005, and Mularkey resigned as head coach at the completion of the 2005 season.  The Bills then named Dick Jauron as their head coach for the 2006 season.  Jauron was the first coach since Phillips' dismissal with prior head coaching experience, having previously served as head coach of the Chicago Bears and interim head coach of the Detroit Lions.  Jauron coached the Bills to three consecutive 7–9 seasons before being fired on November 17, 2009, nine games into the 2009 season.  Defensive Coordinator Perry Fewell was named as the interim head coach, going 3-4 to finish out the season before all of the Bills coaching staff was fired on January 4, 2010. On January 19, 2010, the Bills named Chan Gailey as their next head coach; Gailey was fired on December 31, 2012. In January 2013, Doug Marrone was appointed.  He exercised his option to leave in January 2015 following the change of ownership to Kim and Terrence Pegula and was replaced by Rex Ryan. Rex Ryan was fired from the team on December 27, 2016. Anthony Lynn served as interim head coach until January 11, when the team hired Sean McDermott to serve in the role on a permanent basis.

Key

Coaches
Note: Statistics are accurate through the end of the 2022 NFL season.

Notes
 A running total of the number of coaches of the Bills. Thus, any coach who has two terms as head coach is only counted once.
 Before 1972, the AFL and NFL did not count ties in the calculations for winning percentage. After 1972, they were counted as a half-win and half-loss.
 Each year is linked to an article about that NFL season.
 Joe Collier was fired two games into the 1968 season, after leading the Bills to an 0–2 record. The Bills personnel director, Harvey Johnson, was named interim head coach.
 On December 21, 1971, Lou Saban joined the Bills again as head coach. He was also named vice president of football operations. Head coach Harvey Johnson was named director of pro personnel.
 On October 15, 1976, Lou Saban resigned as head coach of the Bills. He was replaced by offensive line coach Jim Ringo. Despite coaching the Bills to nine straight losses after Saban's resignation, Ringo was given a coaching contract for the 1977 season in December 1976.
 On October 1, 1985, Kay Stephenson was fired after leading the team to a 0–4 record. He was replaced by his assistant Hank Bullough.
 On November 3, 1986, Hank Bullough was fired as head coach and replaced by Marv Levy, the former head coach of the Kansas City Chiefs.
 On November 17, 2009, Dick Jauron was fired as head coach and replaced by defensive coordinator Perry Fewell on an interim basis.
 Four coaches in Bills history have had a winning record in their first season: Joe Collier (9–4–1 in 1966); Wade Phillips (10–6–0 in 1998), Mike Mularkey (9–7–0 in 2004) and Sean McDermott (9-7-0 in 2017). Two other coaches just missed – their teams each had ".500" records. Lou Saban was 7–6–1 in 1962 and Kay Stephenson was 8–8 in 1983.
  Lou Saban's full coaching record with the Bills is 117 regular season games coached with a record of 68–45–4 and a W–L percentage of .602. He is also 2–2 in 4 Playoff games.
 Harvey Johnson's full coaching record with the Bills is 26 regular season games coached with a record of 2–23–1 and a W–L percentage of .080.
 On December 27, 2016, Rex Ryan was fired as head coach and replaced by offensive coordinator Anthony Lynn on an interim basis.

References
General
 
 

Specific

Buffalo Bills
 
Head coaches